Simon Look is a retired Israeli football (soccer) forward who played professionally in Israel and in the American Soccer League and Major Indoor Soccer League.

Professional
Look spent his youth with the Maccabi Jaffa F.C., turning professional with the first team when he was sixteen.  In 1980, he moved to the United States where he signed with the Cleveland Force of the Major Indoor Soccer League.  He spent two seasons with the Force and in 1981 played the summer outdoor season with the Cleveland Cobras of the American Soccer League.  He then returned to Israel where he rejoined Maccabi Jaffa.

Personal
Simon Look is of a Tunisian-Jewish descent. He is currently not married and has four children, three boys and one daughter. He spends most of his time coaching the younger generation as well as playing pick up games any chance he can.

National team
Look played for the Israeli Junior National and the Israeli Olympic teams.

References

External links
 Club bio
 MISL stats

1958 births
Israeli Jews
Living people
Israeli footballers
Maccabi Jaffa F.C. players
American Soccer League (1933–1983) players
Cleveland Cobras players
Cleveland Force (original MISL) players
Liga Leumit players
Israeli expatriate footballers
Major Indoor Soccer League (1978–1992) players
Israeli people of Tunisian-Jewish descent
Footballers from Jaffa
Association football forwards
Expatriate soccer players in the United States
Israeli expatriate sportspeople in the United States